Frost Island is an island in the San Juan Islands of the U.S. state of Washington.  The approximately 70-acre (28 ha) island has no public electric service or land-line telephone service.  There is a water-taxi that runs between the island and Anacortes.

The name was given by Charles Wilkes during the Wilkes Expedition of 1838–1842, in honor of John Frost, the boatswain of the expedition's Porpoise.

References

San Juan Islands